Admir Smajić (born 7 September 1963) is a Bosnian professional football manager and former player.

He played for the Yugoslav national team and the Bosnia and Herzegovina national team.

Club career

Partizan
Born in Bijeljina, SR Bosnia and Herzegovina, Smajić began his career in his local town with FK Radnik Bijeljina. In 1979 Radnik reached the 1/8 finals of the Yugoslav Cup with Smajić being part of the team and that sealed him a move to Belgrade to play in FK Partizan. He made his senior debut with Partizan in the 1979–80 Yugoslav First League.

He played 9 consecutive seasons with Partizan, where he won 3 Yugoslav championships. Whilst at Partizan he represented Yugoslavia at the 1984 Summer Olympics in Los Angeles where they reached the semi-finals before being eliminated by France. Later, in 1987 he also debuted for the main Yugoslav national team.

Period in Switzerland
In 1988 Smajić moved abroad to Switzerland. He signed for the Swiss Nationalliga A team Neuchâtel Xamax for the 1988–89 Nationalliga A season. Xamax had won the two previous championships. However, they failed to defend their title and could not win the championship during the time that Smajić played for them. Smajić played four and a half seasons for Xamax. They did manage to reach the final, but were runners-up of the Swiss Cup in 1990. 

Together with his Xamax team mate Frédéric Chassot, Smajić joined FC Basel's first team during the winter break of their 1992–93 season under head-coach Friedel Rausch. Smajić played his domestic league debut for his new club in the home game in the St. Jakob Stadium on 7 March 1993 as Basel played a 1–1 draw with FC Wil. He scored his first goal for the club in the away game on 3 April. It was the second goal of the match as Basel won 4–1 against Locarno. However the team failed in their bid for promotion, losing precious points against the promotion rivals during the last few games of the season. Frédéric Chassot was, however, the team’s top goal scorer in this stage with 9 goals and Smajić gave the most assists.

During Basel's 1993–94 season, under head-coach Claude Andrey, Smajić's team mates were the likes of Swiss international goalkeeper Stefan Huber, defenders Massimo Ceccaroni, Marco Walker and Samir Tabakovic, the midfielders Mario Cantaluppi, Martin Jeitziner and Ørjan Berg and the Swiss international strikers Dario Zuffi and Philippe Hertig. Together they won the promotion/relegation group and became Nationalliga B champions thus won promotion to the top flight of Swiss football After six seasons in the second tier.

After their promotion, Smajić stayed with Basel for another two and a half season. During his time with the club Smajić played a total of 159 games for Basel scoring a total of 30 goals. 101 of these games were in the Nationalliga B and Nationalliga A, 13 in the Swiss Cup, six in the UEFA Intertoto Cup and 29 were friendly games. He scored 12 goals in the domestic league, 5 in the Swiss Cup, one in the UIC and the other 12 were scored during the test games.

During the winter break of the 1997–98 Nationalliga A season Smajić moved to BSC Young Boys and helped them win promotion as well. He played two and a half seasons for their first team and then took up a player-manager role for their reserve team in 1998. He was sacked at the end of the season and he also retired from his playing career.

International career
After representing Yugoslavia at the 1984 Olympics, Smajić later became an A international for the Yugoslav national team. Between friendly games, and qualifiers for the 1988 UEFA European Championship, he had made 5 appearances in 1987.

Almost a decade later, and after the break-up of Yugoslavia, he became part of national team of Bosnia and Herzegovina, making two appearances in 1996. Smajić was given an emotional farewell in what was likely his last appearance for the Bosnian national team on 25 April 2000 in Sarajevo, a 0–1 result in a friendly against FIFA All Stars (Thomas Häßler, Roberto Baggio, Mustapha Hadji, Bernard Lama and Dunga, among others that made up the All Stars team).

Managerial career
Throughout his managerial career, Smajić didn't manage many teams. From 1998 to 1999 he was the player-manager of BSC Young Boys, from 2001 to 2002 head coach of the Bosnia and Herzegovina U21 national team, from 2003 to 2004 manager of Yverdon-Sport FC and for a short time in 2004, from April to June, manager of FC Sion.

It wasn't until 2011 that Smajić got his next managerial duty, being the Yverdon-Sport assistant manager to Italian manager Vittorio Bevilacqua. In 2014 he came back to Sion, becoming an assistant to German manager Jochen Dries. After Dries got sacked in December 2014, Smajić took over as new manager of the Sion II team. He managed the II team until September 2015.

In June 2018, Smajić was named as the new team manager of Bosnian Premier League club Sloboda Tuzla, while Milenko Bošnjaković became the new manager of Sloboda. On 13 July 2018, only eight games before the start of the season, Smajić decided to leave Sloboda, stating that because of his back issues he needed to get a back surgery in Switzerland.

On 10 June 2019, one year after leaving Sloboda, he came back to the club and became its new team manager, signing a one-year contract. Shortly after, Mile Lazarević was announced as the new manager of Sloboda and worked alongside Smajić. On 1 October 2019, a few days after Lazarević resigned from his managerial position, Smajić also decided to resign from his position and leave Sloboda for a second time.

Managerial statistics

Honours

Player
Partizan
Yugoslav First League: 1982–83, 1985–86, 1986–87
Neuchâtel Xamax
Swiss Super Cup: 1988

Yugoslavia
Summer Olympics Third place: 1984

References

Sources
Rotblau: Jahrbuch Saison 2017/2018. Publisher: FC Basel Marketing AG. 
Die ersten 125 Jahre. Publisher: Josef Zindel im Friedrich Reinhardt Verlag, Basel. 
Verein "Basler Fussballarchiv" Homepage

External links

Admir Smajić at Soccerway
Admir Smajić profile at sports-olympics.com
Admir Smajić international stats at 11v11.com

1963 births
Living people
People from Bijeljina
Association football defenders
Association football midfielders
Yugoslav footballers
Yugoslavia international footballers
Olympic footballers of Yugoslavia
Footballers at the 1984 Summer Olympics
Medalists at the 1984 Summer Olympics
Olympic bronze medalists for Yugoslavia
Olympic medalists in football
Bosnia and Herzegovina international footballers
Dual internationalists (football)
Bosnia and Herzegovina footballers
FK Partizan players
Neuchâtel Xamax FCS players
FC Basel players
BSC Young Boys players
Yugoslav First League players
Swiss Super League players
Swiss Challenge League players
Yugoslav expatriate footballers
Bosnia and Herzegovina expatriate footballers
Expatriate footballers in Switzerland
Yugoslav expatriate sportspeople in Switzerland
Bosnia and Herzegovina expatriate sportspeople in Switzerland
Bosnia and Herzegovina football managers
Expatriate football managers in Switzerland
BSC Young Boys managers
Bosnia and Herzegovina national under-21 football team managers
Yverdon-Sport FC managers
FC Sion managers
FK Sloboda Tuzla managers
Premier League of Bosnia and Herzegovina managers
Bosnia and Herzegovina expatriate football managers
Bosniaks of Bosnia and Herzegovina